Nir Seroussi is a music executive, producer and songwriter. He is currently Executive Vice President at Interscope Geffen A&M Records. He was previously the President of Sony Music U.S. Latin.

Early life and education

Born in Israel, Nir Seroussi moved to the United States to attend to Berklee College of Music in Boston in 1993 where he majored in Music Business/Management and graduated summa cum laude.

Career

Seroussi began his career in music publishing in 1998 at Insignia Music (founded by K.C. Porter ). As General Manager, he headed the company's joint ventures with Universal Music Publishing Group and Famous Music. 
Seroussi left Insignia Music in 2000 to pursue songwriting full-time. In 2002, he joined EMI Latin as Vice President of Marketing and A&R. He worked as a songwriter, A&R, and marketing executive for Regional Mexican artists Intocable and A.B. Quintanilla III, brother of the late singer Selena.

In 2004, he was named Vice President of Marketing and A&R at Sony BMG US Latin. In 2011, he was appointed Managing Director of Sony Music U.S Latin. Three years later, he was promoted to president. Seroussi signed the following artists to Sony Music U.S. Latin: Bomba Estereo, Fonseca, Farruko, Gente De Zona, Leslie Grace Maluma, Nicky Jam, Mau y Ricky, Gerardo Ortiz, Ozuna, Paloma Mami, Prince Royce, Wisin and Yandel. In November 2018, he signed the Jenni Rivera Estate under a joint venture between The Orchard and Sony Music Latin. Under Seroussi's direction, Sony Music U.S. Latin ended 2018 as the U.S.'s leading Latin music label, according to Nielsen Music. In February 2019, Seroussi joined Interscope Geffen A&M Records as Executive Vice President to "sign and develop talent for the company while also working across the entire roster to strengthen artists' global reach".

Seroussi was included on the 2012 Best Bets list in Billboard. He was the 2012 recipient of the Chai Lifeline Legacy of Hope Award. He was profiled in Billboard'''s annual 40 Under 40 Power Players list in 2013 2014. and 2015 He was included on the Latin Power Player by Billboard'' in 2015, 2016, 2017 and 2018.

Songwriting

Seroussi is a songwriter who has composed for numerous Latin artists, including A.B. Quintanilla III & Los Kumbia Kings, Chelo, Chicos De Barrio, Conjunto Primavera, German Lizárraga, Intocable, Luis Coronel, Melina León, Olga Tañon, OV7, Ozomatli, Pee Wee, Pepe Aguilar, El Poder Del Norte, Rey Ruiz, Reik, Ricardo Montaner and Yuridia, among others.

In 2005, Seroussi received a BMI Latin Award for "Mi Gente" performed by A.B. Quintanilla y Los Kumbia Kings featuring Ozomatli. He received a BMI Latin Award in 2014 for "Prometiste" performed by Pepe Aguilar.

References

Living people
1970 births
Israeli businesspeople
Israeli Jews
American music industry executives
American people of Israeli descent
Sony Music